Translocating chain-associated membrane protein 2 is a protein that in humans is encoded by the TRAM2 gene.

TRAM2 is a component of the translocon, a gated macromolecular channel that controls the posttranslational processing of nascent secretory and membrane proteins at the endoplasmic reticulum (ER) membrane.

References

Further reading